Habitat: The Mindoro scops owl (Otus mindorensis) is an owl that is native to the Mindoro island in the Philippines. They live in a terrestrial environment and their main habitat consists of the highly elevated forests with a very small global range Meaning they do not migrate or have movement patterns. The ongoing clearance of forest habitats has slightly affected their habitat. As of October 1, 2016, the Mindoro Scops Owl species has been labeled to be a newly threatened species, or critically endangered species. For instance, the Montane forest has been almost completely cleared out by logging operations, which may pose a threat to this species. 

Population: The Mindoro scop owl is a near threatened species due to on-going habitat destruction, causing a decreasing population trend with a ripe number of 10,000-19,999 mature individuals. However, their total population equates to about 15,000-29,000 individuals. The continuing decline of mature individuals is unknown and the population is not severely fragmented. There is only one subpopulation with about 10,000- 19999 individuals. 

Identification: The Mindoro Scop Owls are amongst the smallest owls in existence – second only to the tiny Elf Owls. They only measure in between 6.5 – 12 inches (16.5 – 30 cm) in lengthThey have bright neon yellow eyes and short ear tufts that aid them in locating prey. While their small bodies are dark brown with a speckled pattern, their face and chest are a light brown. Their coloring specifically helps them appear as camouflage to predators or prey. Mindoro Scop Owls also have the ability to stretch their bodies in a way that appears leaner. They sway back and forth to look as if they are a tree branch moving in a breeze

Diet: The Mindoro Scop Owl’s diet mostly consists of bugs and insects, however, there is no published quantitative data; information measured by numerical variables, to prove this or the amount consumed. They also consume small birds or small mammals such as bats, mice, earthworms, amphibians and aquatic invertebrates

Behavior: The Mindoro Scop Owls communicate with one another in a high pitched whistle call that rises or falls in repeated intervals. The male calls include a soft “po-wo” or “wo-wo” that lasts about .5 second with repeated intervals of 8-10 seconds. Their call is in response to another Mindoro Scop Owl. 

Reproduction: Specimen collected in the year 1896 reports that Mindoro Scop Owls have well developed eggs within the months of January and May. Their eggs and nests are not described.

References

 BirdLife Species Factsheet - Mindoro Scops-owl
 Owl pages

Mindoro scops owl
Birds of Mindoro
Mindoro scops owl